Juan José Cáceres Palomares (born 27 December 1949) is a Peruvian football goalkeeper who played for Peru in the 1978 FIFA World Cup. He also played for Alianza Lima.

References

External links
 
FIFA profile

1949 births
Living people
People from Lima Region
Association football goalkeepers
Peruvian footballers
Peru international footballers
Unión Huaral footballers
Colegio Nacional Iquitos footballers
Club Universitario de Deportes footballers
Club Alianza Lima footballers
FBC Melgar footballers
1978 FIFA World Cup players